Miguel Ligero may refer to:

 Miguel Ligero (Argentine actor) (1911–1989)
 Miguel Ligero (Spanish actor) (1890–1968)